Bad Boys II is a 2003 American buddy cop action comedy film directed by Michael Bay, produced by Jerry Bruckheimer, and starring Martin Lawrence and Will Smith. The sequel to the 1995 film Bad Boys and the second film in the Bad Boys film series, the film follows detectives Burnett and Lowrey investigating the flow of illegal drugs going into Miami.

Bad Boys II was released on July 18, 2003. It received extremely negative reviews from critics but did fairly well commercially, grossing $273 million worldwide. A third film, Bad Boys for Life, was released in January 2020.

Plot
MPD Officers Mike and Marcus are investigating the flow of ecstasy into Miami. They infiltrate a Klan meeting held in the marshland outside of Miami only to discover that they are, in fact, buyers and not distributors of the ecstasy. After a radio malfunction leads to a delayed arrival of Miami Police’s Tactical Narcotics Team (TNT), Mike and Marcus end up in a shootout with the Klansmen that results in many casualties and injuries, with Marcus accidentally sustaining a gunshot wound to the buttocks from Mike.

These antics lead Marcus to re-evaluate whether he wants to remain partners with Mike, who is secretly dating Syd, Marcus’ younger sister. Unbeknownst to both Marcus and Mike, Syd is working undercover for the Drug Enforcement Administration (DEA) as a money launderer to a branch of the Russian Mafia operating in Miami’s drug trade. The Russians, in turn, are the main distributors of ecstasy for Cuban drug lord Hector Juan Carlos “Johnny” Tapia. After laundering a large sum of money for the Russians, Syd is intercepted by a Haitian Zoe Pound gang while she is transporting the money. Mike and Marcus, working on a tip from an informant, had been following the Haitians when the latter made their move, leading to an extensive gun battle and car chase between Miami police cars, Mike Lowery's Ferrari 550, and a stolen 18-wheeler car carrier driven by the Haitians through Miami that resulted in significant collateral damage, as well as the angry reprimand of Mike and Marcus by Captain Howard, who was further angered to find out the DEA was running an investigation in Miami without consulting him first.

Mike and Marcus then track down the surviving Haitians, and after another gun battle inside the leader’s house, they interrogate the leader and learn from one of the Haitian’s video camera that Tapia is using a local mortuary as a front for his operations. To gain more intel Mike and Marcus pose as pest exterminators responding to a rat infestation at Tapia’s Miami residence. They use the cover to gain access to the mansion and plant bugs throughout the premises. Meanwhile, Tapia has had a meeting with his Russian business associates Alexei and Josef. While he discusses his business with Alexei, Tapia has Josef butchered in his kitchen and places the remains in a tortilla bin as a threat to Alexei to sign over all of his Miami night clubs where he distributes ecstasy. Mike discovers some of Josef’s remains in the kitchen where he was dismembered, smuggling a pinky finger for later identification. With the Russians removed from the equation, Tapia begins a mixed business-personal relationship with Syd wherein he intends for her to launder all of the money for his operation.

Later, Mike and Marcus infiltrate Tapia’s mortuary. Inside they discover that Tapia is using cadavers and coffins to smuggle drugs and money in and out of the country. However, Marcus accidentally swallows two ecstasy pills and ends up high in the process before escaping. The evidence is sufficient for Captain Howard to authorize a raid on both Tapia’s residence and the mortuary in collaboration with the DEA and the U.S. Coast Guard. Nearly all of Tapia’s drug supply and money are confiscated in the raid, though Tapia flees to Cuba with Syd as a hostage before he can be apprehended. Using her as a bargaining chip, Tapia demands the return of his money from Miami PD. Knowing that’s impossible, Mike and Marcus arrange a covert operation to rescue Syd, forming a black-ops team with agents from the DEA, TNT, and Captain Howard’s contacts from the CIA.

The team is inserted by the Coast Guard a few miles off the coast of Cuba, where they rendezvous with a fellow officer’s brother, Tito, who is head of the local Alpha 66 underground resistance in Cuba. There, Tito assists the teams with weapons, a tunnel network, and an accurate mapping of Tapia’s new mansion.

The team infiltrates Tapia’s mansion, rescues Syd, and leaves a large explosive device that demolishes the mansion upon the team’s exfiltration. Marcus and Mike, along with Syd and Tito steal a yellow Hummer H2 as they escape from Cuban military forces. Tapia survives and pursues Mike, Marcus, Syd, and Tito through the countryside and the village of hillside shacks where cocaine is processed, ultimately ending up outside of Guantanamo Bay. Not recognized as U.S. Citizens, the Navy personnel on the base shoot at both Mike and Marcus as well as Tapia’s vehicles, prompting them to stop just as they enter a live minefield. With only a couple of rounds remaining in their weapons, Marcus manages to shoot Tapia in the head while the latter holds Mike at gunpoint. Tapia falls backward onto a mine which obliterates his corpse.

Later, Mike, Marcus, and Syd celebrate at a barbecue in Marcus’ backyard with his family; Marcus has decided to remain partners with Mike.

Cast

Music

Reception

Critical response
On Rotten Tomatoes, Bad Boys II holds an approval rating 23% based on 183 reviews, and a weighted average of 4.08/10. The site's critical consensus states, "Two and a half hours of explosions and witless banter."  On Metacritic, the film has a weighted average score of 38 out of 100, based on 34 critics, indicating "generally unfavorable reviews". Audiences polled by CinemaScore gave the film an average grade of "A" on an A+ to F scale, same as the first film.

Roger Ebert of the Chicago Sun-Times gave the film one out of a possible four stars, especially offended by one scene involving a teenage boy and the use of the word nigga, saying, "The needless cruelty of this scene took me out of the movie and into the minds of its makers. What were they thinking? Have they so lost touch with human nature that they think audiences will like this scene?" On an episode of At the Movies with Ebert & Roeper, film critic Richard Roeper named Bad Boys II the worst film of 2003.

James Berardinelli of ReelViews was even more negative about the film, rating it half a star out of four and stating: "Bad Boys II isn't just bad - it's a catastrophic violation of every aspect of cinema that I as a film critic hold dear."

Among the more positive reviews was Seattle Post-Intelligencer critic Ellen A. Kim, who wrote that the film was "mindlessly fun... If you like this type of movie, that is." The film was also praised by a few critics and viewers for its deftly handled action sequences and visual effects.

Box office
Bad Boys II was a financial success. For its opening weekend, the film generated $46.5 million, making it the fourth-highest opening weekend for an R-rated film, behind The Matrix Reloaded, Hannibal and 8 Mile. It made $138 million North America and $135 million in other territories, totaling $273 million worldwide against a budget of $130 million — almost twice the gross of the original film.

Accolades

At the 2004 MTV Movie Awards, the film was nominated for "Best Action Sequence" for the inter-coastal freeway pursuit and "Best On-Screen Team", but lost to The Lord of the Rings: The Return of the King and 50 First Dates, respectively.

Bad Boys II was nominated at the 2nd Annual Visual Effects Society Awards (VES) for "Outstanding Supporting Visual Effects in a Motion Picture".

At the 2003 Stinkers Bad Movie Awards, the film won the award for Worst Sequel. It was also nominated for Most Intrusive Musical Score but lost to Charlie's Angels: Full Throttle.

In other media

Video game
A video game version of the film, known as Bad Boys: Miami Takedown in North America, was released in 2004 on the PlayStation 2, Xbox, GameCube and Windows. Originally planned for release in late 2003 (to tie in with the film's DVD release), the game was pushed back several months. The game failed to deliver any sort of sales or critical acclaim due to poor development; it was given low ratings from many game websites.

Sequel

In June 2008, Bay stated that he may direct Bad Boys III, but that the greatest obstacle to the potential sequel would be the cost, as he and Will Smith demand some of the highest salaries in the film industry. By August 2009, Columbia Pictures had hired Peter Craig to write the script for Bad Boys III. In February 2011, Martin Lawrence reiterated that the film was in development. In June 2014, Bruckheimer announced that screenwriter David Guggenheim was working on the storyline for the sequel. Two months later, Lawrence said a script had been written and parts had been cast. By June 2015, director Joe Carnahan was in early talks to write and possibly direct the film. Two months later, Sony Pictures Entertainment announced that Bad Boys III would be released on February 17, 2017, and that additional sequel, Bad Boys IV, is scheduled for release on July 3, 2019. On March 5, 2016, the film was pushed to June 2, 2017. Producers planned to begin production in early 2017. On August 11, 2016, the film was pushed back once again to January 12, 2018, to avoid box office competition with the upcoming DC Comics film Wonder Woman, and retitled Bad Boys for Life. Lawrence revealed on Jimmy Kimmel Live! that filming may start in March 2017. On February 6, 2017, it was announced that the film's release date has been delayed for the third time, to November 9, 2018. On March 7, 2017, Carnahan left the movie due to scheduling conflicts. In August 2017, Sony removed the third film from their release schedule and later in the month Lawrence said the film would not be happening.

In February 2018, it was reported that a sequel film was again being planned and will be directed by Belgian directors Adil El Arbi and Bilall Fallah, after development on Beverly Hills Cop IV stalled, with Martin Lawrence and Will Smith reprising their roles. Joe Pantoliano also reprised his role as Captain Howard. Filming began in January 2019.

Television series

In October 2017, a spinoff television series centered on Gabrielle Union's character, was announced to be in development by Brandon Margolis and Brandon Sonnier. Later that month NBC ordered the pilot episode of the series.
By March 2018, Jessica Alba was cast as the co-star with Gabrielle Union. In addition to Union, John Salley will also reprise his role as Fletcher, a computer hacker who helps Mike and Marcus in the film series. The following month, the title of the series was revealed as LA's Finest, with Jerry Bruckheimer serving as executive producer for the series. Later that month, NBC passed on the pilot, and the show was shopped around to other networks. NBC's boss, Bob Greenblatt, said: “These are all tough calls. We did have an embarrassment of riches. And when we laid out the schedule and the calendar all season...it was a show that didn’t fit in the grand scheme of it.”

That same month, it was revealed that Sony Pictures Television, was negotiating with Charter Communications about picking up the series. By June 2018, Canada's Bell Media picked it up for 13 episodes. Charter gave its series order on June 26, intent on making it Spectrum's first original series.

Home media 
Bad Boys II was released on VHS and DVD on December 9, 2003. A Blu-ray release followed on November 10, 2015. Bad Boys II was included in a two film collection that includes the first film which was released on Ultra HD Blu-ray on September 4, 2018.

See also
 Bad Boys (franchise)
 Police Story (1985) - inspired the very similar shanty town chase sequence in the film

References

External links

 
 
 
 
 

2003 films
2003 action comedy films
2000s American films
2000s buddy comedy films
2000s buddy cop films
2000s chase films
2000s English-language films
African-American films
African-American action films
African-American comedy films
American action comedy films
American buddy comedy films
American buddy cop films
American chase films
American police detective films
American sequel films
Bad Boys (franchise)
Columbia Pictures films
Fictional portrayals of the Miami-Dade Police Department
Films about the Drug Enforcement Administration
Films directed by Michael Bay
Films produced by Jerry Bruckheimer
Films scored by Trevor Rabin
Films set in 2003
Films set in Cuba
Films set in Miami
Films shot in Miami
Films shot in Puerto Rico
Films with screenplays by Jerry Stahl
Hood films